Héctor Eduardo Echagüe (born 24 January 1988) is an Argentine professional footballer who plays as a midfielder for Defensores de Pronunciamiento.

Career
Echagüe began his career with Primera División side Independiente. He made his senior debut on 20 June 2009 during a fixture with San Lorenzo, coming off the substitutes bench in place of Roberto Vissio with twenty-four minutes remaining. His first start arrived days later against Arsenal de Sarandí, which was his final appearance for the club. Echagüe departed to Torneo Argentino B's Textil Mandiyú in 2010, going on to play twelve times. Echagüe had a five-day stint with 9 de Julio in January 2012. Further moves to Güemes and Defensores de Pronunciamiento came, along with twenty-six goals.

On 14 August 2017, Echagüe joined Defensores Unidos of Primera C Metropolitana. After promotion in his first season, a late cameo in a 1–0 loss away to UAI Urquiza on 19 August saw the midfielder make his bow in Primera B Metropolitana; with his first goal coming in the succeeding September versus Almirante Brown. He departed Defensores at the end that season, prior to securing a return to Defensores de Pronunciamiento in July 2019.

Career statistics
.

Honours
Defensores de Pronunciamiento
Torneo Federal B: 2015

Defensores Unidos
Primera C Metropolitana: 2017–18

References

External links

1988 births
Living people
People from Corrientes
Argentine footballers
Association football midfielders
Argentine Primera División players
Torneo Argentino B players
Torneo Federal A players
Primera C Metropolitana players
Primera B Metropolitana players
Club Atlético Independiente footballers
Textil Mandiyú footballers
9 de Julio de Morteros players
Defensores Unidos footballers